Alain Mikli (born Alain Miklitarian; 1 April 1955) is a French-Armenian designer of high-end handmade eyeglasses and accessories. Mikli's line features unique colors and shapes, and are a favorite among European celebrities and avant-garde Americans.  Mikli claims his use of color is inspired by his Lebanese Armenian heritage.

Career
In 1978, Mikli opened his design studio in Paris. By 1983, celebrities like Elton John helped bring the line recognition by wearing and touting Mikli products. Kanye West wore Alain Mikli sunglasses in his music video, Stronger, which he specifically requested from the designer. This style of sunglasses has become a wide phenomenon, usually being referred to as "shutter shades". As of 2000, Mikli's firm employed 220 people with sales of approx. FF220 million. Around 500,000 pairs of Mikli glasses have been sold worldwide.

On 23 January 2013, Alain Mikli International was bought by Italian eyewear giant Luxottica for around 90 million euros.

References

External links
Home page

1955 births
Living people
French designers
French people of Armenian descent
Lebanese people of Armenian descent
Luxottica